The Adelaide Football Club's 2015 season was its 25th season in the Australian Football League (AFL). The club also fielded a reserves team in the South Australian National Football League (SANFL).

Squad

AFL season

Ladder

AFL finals series

Match Review Panel

References

Adelaide Football Club seasons
Adelaide